Kenneth Kalish is a  game programmer who wrote TRS-80 Color Computer and Dragon 32/64 home computers in the 1980s. In the United Kingdom, most of Kalish's games were published by Microdeal.

Games
 Danger Ranger
 Dungeon Raid
 El Diablero
 Monkey Kong
 Phantom Slayer
 Devil Assault

References

External links
An Interview with Ken Kalish  by L. Curtis Boyle

Year of birth missing (living people)
Video game programmers
TRS-80 Color Computer
Living people
Place of birth missing (living people)